Raghuraj Singh Shakya is an Indian politician and a member of 16th Legislative Assembly of Uttar Pradesh of India. He represents the Etawah constituency of Uttar Pradesh and is a member of the Bhartiya Janata Party.

On 27 January 2017, Shakya resigned from his position believing that Mulayam Singh Yadav was being humiliated in the recent dispute between Mulayam and Akhilesh Yadav.

On 7 February 2022, Raghuraj Singh Shakya joins Bhartiya Janata Party.

Political career
Shakya has been a member of the 16th Legislative Assembly of Uttar Pradesh. Since 2012, he has represented the Etawah (Assembly constituency) and is a member of the Samajwadi Party. In 2012 elections  he defeated Bahujan Samaj Party candidate Mahendra Singh Rajpoot by a margin of 6,264 votes.

Posts held

References

1968 births
Living people
People from Uttar Pradesh
People from Etawah
India MPs 2004–2009
Samajwadi Party politicians
Lok Sabha members from Uttar Pradesh
India MPs 1999–2004
Pragatisheel Samajwadi Party (Lohiya) politicians